In geometry, the rhombtriapeirogonal tiling is a uniform tiling of the hyperbolic plane with a Schläfli symbol of rr{∞,3}.

Symmetry 
This tiling has [∞,3], (*∞32) symmetry. There is only one uniform coloring.

Similar to the Euclidean rhombitrihexagonal tiling, by edge-coloring there is a half symmetry form (3*∞) orbifold notation. The apeireogons can be considered as truncated, t{∞} with two types of edges. It has Coxeter diagram , Schläfli symbol s2{3,∞}. The squares can be distorted into isosceles trapezoids. In the limit, where the rectangles degenerate into edges, an infinite-order triangular tiling results, constructed as a snub triapeirotrigonal tiling, .

Related polyhedra and tiling

Symmetry mutations 
This hyperbolic tiling is topologically related as a part of sequence of uniform cantellated polyhedra with vertex configurations (3.4.n.4), and [n,3] Coxeter group symmetry.

See also

List of uniform planar tilings
Tilings of regular polygons
Uniform tilings in hyperbolic plane

References

 John H. Conway, Heidi Burgiel, Chaim Goodman-Strass, The Symmetries of Things 2008,  (Chapter 19, The Hyperbolic Archimedean Tessellations)

External links 

Apeirogonal tilings
Hyperbolic tilings
Isogonal tilings
Uniform tilings